The Pucciniosiraceae are a family of rust fungi in the order Pucciniales. The family contains 10 genera and 57 species.

In 2018, they were placed within the Uredinales order (which was a previous name for the Pucciniales). They are 'endocyclic rusts', species with endocyclic life cycles and having reduced autoecious life cycles (they complete their life cycle on a single host species), in which the aeciospores function as teliospores.

Genera
As accepted by Species Fungorum;
Alveolaria - 2 spp.
Baeodromus - 6 spp.
Ceratocoma - 1 sp. (Ceratocoma jacksoniae )
Chardoniella - 4 spp.
Cionothrix - 6 spp.
Didymopsora - 6 spp.
Dietelia - 12 spp.
Gambleola - 1 sp. (Gambleola cornuta )
Pucciniosira - 15 spp.
Trichopsora - 1 sp. (Trichopsora tournefortiae )

References

External links

Pucciniales
Basidiomycota families